The 1868 United States presidential election in Connecticut took place on November 3, 1868, as part of the 1868 United States presidential election. Voters chose six representatives, or electors to the Electoral College, who voted for president and vice president.

Connecticut voted for the Republican nominee, Ulysses S. Grant, over the Democratic nominee, Horatio Seymour. Grant won the state by a narrow margin of 2.98%.

Results

See also
 United States presidential elections in Connecticut

References

Connecticut
1868
1868 Connecticut elections